The 2007 Amirli bombing was a suicide car bomb attack that occurred on July 7, 2007, in a market in the town of Amirli, Iraq, whose residents are mainly Shia Turkmens. The bombing killed 156 people with 255 injured.

See also
 2007 suicide bombings in Iraq

References

2007 murders in Iraq
Mass murder in 2007
Terrorist incidents in Iraq in 2007
Suicide car and truck bombings in Iraq
Marketplace attacks in Iraq
Violence against Shia Muslims in Iraq
July 2007 events in Asia